Qin Shengxiang (born February 1957) is an admiral of the Chinese People's Liberation Army Navy (PLAN) who was Political Commissar of the PLA Navy from September 2017 to January 2022. He formerly served as Director of the General Office of the Central Military Commission.

Career
Qin Shengxiang was born in February 1957 in Jianli, Hubei Province. He worked for many years in the Central Military Commission, and served as Vice Director and then Director of the Organization Department of the PLA General Political Department. He attained the rank of major general in about 2007.

In December 2012, Qin was appointed Director of the General Office of the Central Military Commission, succeeding Wang Guanzhong. He was promoted to the rank of lieutenant general in July 2015. After Central Military Commission chairman Xi Jinping's military reform in January 2016, Qin also served as the first Director of the newly established Office for Reform and Organizational Structure.

In September 2017, Qin was appointed Political Commissar of the People's Liberation Army Navy, replacing Admiral Miao Hua. In October 2017, he was elected a member of the 19th Central Committee of the Communist Party of China.

References

1957 births
Living people
People's Liberation Army generals from Hubei
Political commissars of the People's Liberation Army Navy
Members of the 19th Central Committee of the Chinese Communist Party
People from Jingzhou